Giovanni Battista Cassana (1668–1738) was an Italian painter. He was born the youngest son of Giovanni Francesco Cassana. He excelled in painting fruit, flowers, and still-life.

See also
Cassana (family)

References

People from Mirandola
17th-century Italian painters
Italian male painters
18th-century Italian painters
Italian still life painters
1668 births
1738 deaths
18th-century Italian male artists